Forks of Cacapon, formerly Forks of Capon, is an unincorporated community in Hampshire County in the U.S. state of West Virginia. The community is named for its location at the confluence of the North River and Cacapon River. Forks of Cacapon is also located at another fork: the crossroads of West Virginia Route 29, West Virginia Route 127, and Frank Haines Road (West Virginia Secondary Route 45/5).

The community was originally known by the name of its post office, Forks of Capon. The post office was in operation from the mid-19th century until 1910. John Loy served as its final post master. Despite the name of its former post office, the community is now referred to as Forks of Cacapon.

Historic sites 
 Capon View Farm, Gaston Road (CR 45/7)
 Fort Capon site, Gaston Road (CR 45/7)
 Island Hill United Methodist Church, WV Route 29 North
 Old Forks of Capon Post Office & General Store, Gaston Road (CR 45/7)

References

External links
 Braddock's Camp at Forks of Capon
  History of the Crossings at the Great Cacapon

Unincorporated communities in Hampshire County, West Virginia
Unincorporated communities in West Virginia